Point Music was a record label that was started in 1992 as a joint venture between Philips Classics and Michael Riesman and Philip Glass’s Euphorbia Productions. In 1999, Decca Records became its distributor when it absorbed Philips in the aftermath of the merger that created Universal Music. It originally specialized in cutting-edge contemporary Western classical music, but it expanded to include film scores, some world music, and rock–classical crossover projects. It was shut down in 2002.

In September 2009, Universal Music released a POINT Music compilation named XVI Reflections on Classical Music, which explored the connections between cutting edge classical and electronic music. Whether this is the beginning of a series of compilations has yet to be confirmed.

Partial discography
 Master Musicians of Jajouka—Brian Jones Presents the Pipes of Pan at Jajouka
 Master Musicians of Jajouka featuring Bachir Attar—The Master Musicians of Jajouka featuring Bachir Attar
 Jon Gibson—In Good Company
 Philip Glass - Low Symphony  	 
 Gavin Bryars - Jesus' Blood Never Failed Me Yet
 Gavin Bryars—Man in a Room, Gambling
 Gavin Bryars—Cadman Requiem
 Arthur Russell—Another Thought
 Gavin Bryars—The Sinking of the Titanic
 London Philharmonic Orchestra—The LPO Plays the Music of Pink Floyd
 London Philharmonic Orchestra—Kashmir: Symphonic Led Zeppelin
 Philip Glass/Uakti—Aguas da Amazonia
 Uakti— I Ching
 Uakti—Mapa
 Uakti—Trilobyte
 Oceania—Oceania 	 
 Bang on a Can—Music for Airports—Brian Eno 	
 Gavin Bryars—The Raising of the "Titanic"	 
 Arthur Russell—Another Thought (Radio Edits) 	 
 Gavin Bryars—Raising the Titanic—the Aphex Twin Mixes
 Philip Glass—"Heroes" Symphony
 Zoar—Cassandra
 Todd Levin—Ride the Planet
 John Moran—The Manson Family—an Opera
 Philip Glass & Foday Musa Suso—Music from the Screens
 Jaron Lanier—Instruments of Change
 Chris Hughes—Shift
 Philip Glass—“Heroes Symphony” (the Aphex Twin Remix)
 Angelo Badalamenti—City of Lost Children—Original Soundtrack
 Giovanni Sollima—Aquilarco
 Pilgrimage—9 Songs of Ecstasy
 Philip Glass, Gavin Bryars and others—XVI Reflections on Classical Music

See also
 List of record labels
 Philips Records
 Decca Records
 Philip Glass

References

External links
 Discogs.com
 philipglass.com
 gavinbryars.com

American record labels
Record labels established in 1992
Record labels disestablished in 2002
Universal Music Group